Book One: Air is the first season of the American animated television series The Legend of Korra created by Michael Dante DiMartino and Bryan Konietzko. Consisting of twelve episodes (called "chapters"), it was initially intended to be a stand-alone epilogue miniseries sequel to Avatar: The Last Airbender before the series was expanded to an order of four seasons ("books") of fifty-two episodes ("chapters") in total. Book One: Air aired from April 14 to June 23, 2012, on the Nickelodeon channel in the U.S., and is broadcast in other countries beginning in June 2012.

Book One: Air follows seventeen-year-old Korra from the Southern Water Tribe, and the successor of Avatar Aang from the preceding series Avatar: The Last Airbender, as she travels to the metropolis of Republic City to learn airbending and faces an anti-bender revolutionary group, the "Equalists", led by the masked Amon.

Broadcast
Before the series premiered on television, it was announced that the first two episodes would be pre-released online if "Korra Nation", an online social-networking platform for the show, reached 100,000 likes and shares. The goal was reached and at midnight on March 24, the first two episodes were released on a Viacom-owned website. They remained online for the duration of the weekend.

Book One: Air aired on Nickelodeon and Nickelodeon HD between April 14, 2012, and June 23, 2012. For U.S. residents, the episodes were available for free viewing on the channel's website and for purchase through digital download services. Nicktoons re-aired Book One, with a few minutes of commentary from the series's creators during commercial breaks, from July 9 to July 20, 2012, under the name Korra: Making of a Legend.

This series debuted in Canada on channel YTV on June 9, 2012, and on Nickelodeon Canada in late 2012.  The series also premiered on Nickelodeon UK and Ireland on July 7, 2013.

Synopsis
The series opens introducing Korra as the Avatar and showing that she has mastered all elemental arts except airbending. Korra runs away to Republic City so that Tenzin, Avatar Aang's youngest son, can train her therein. In the metropolis, Korra clashes with police chief Lin Beifong (the daughter of Toph Beifong of the original series) after dispensing vigilante justice to the local triads. Tarrlok, an ambitious member of the city's ruling council, enlists Korra against the "Equalists", an anti-bender revolution led by the masked Amon. As Korra explores Republic City, she befriends the brothers Mako and Bolin and joins their pro-bending team, the "Fire Ferrets". The team is sponsored by Asami Sato, daughter of a wealthy industrialist, and the four together form the new "Team Avatar".

After Korra's appearance in the city, the Equalists become increasingly violent, climaxing in an attack on the pro-bending arena. When Tarrlok indiscriminately represses non-benders, Korra refuses to support him. In the resulting fight, Tarrlok overpowers Korra with bloodbending, an illegal form of waterbending, and kidnaps her, framing the Equalists. As Amon arrives at Tarrlok's hideout and removes Tarrlok's bending, Korra escapes, only to find Republic City facing an Equalist conquest.

In the two-part finale, naval reinforcements led by Iroh (the grandson of Zuko of the original series), are defeated by Equalist sea mines and biplanes. Attempting to find Amon, Korra learns that Tarrlok and Amon are the sons of Yakone, a mob boss defeated 42 years ago by Avatar Aang. Amon strips Korra of her bending abilities but Korra reveals her dormant airbending abilities in a moment of distress, exposing Amon as a waterbender and causing all his followers to desert him. He flees with Tarrlok, who detonates their boat on the open sea. Despondent, Korra establishes spiritual contact with her predecessor Aang, who restores her bending powers, allowing her to do the same to Amon's other victims.

Episodes

Cast and Characters

Main 

 Janet Varney as Avatar Korra
 David Faustino as Mako
 P. J. Byrne as Bolin
 J. K. Simmons as Tenzin
 Seychelle Gabriel as Asami Sato
 Mindy Sterling as Lin Beifong
 Kiernan Shipka as Jinora
 Dee Bradley Baker as Tarrlok

Recurring 

 Logan Wells as Meelo
 Darcy Rose Byrnes as Ikki
 Steve Blum as Amon
 Lance Henriksen as Amon's Lieutenant
 Daniel Dae Kim as Hiroshi Sato
 Clancy Brown as Yakone

Reception

Reviews
Book One received very positive reviews from critics, with review aggregator Rotten Tomatoes calculating a 91% approval rating for the season from 11 reviews, with an average rating of 8.25/10. The website's critical consensus reads, "The Legend of Korra expands the world of Avatar: The Last Airbender with narrative substance and crisp animation -- and progresses the drama and action with a female lead."

Elements of the first season that received praise were the exceptional quality of the animation, the background paintings and the martial-arts action scenes, as well as the series' innovative and engrossing visual design and style. The writers were credited for finding a believable balance between magic and technology and for their mature and nuanced portrayal of romantic relationships and conflicts. Critics also praised the writers' willingness and ability to tackle difficult themes such as social unrest, terrorism, Tarrlok's murder–suicide of Amon, as well as the insinuation of Korra contemplating suicide during the season finale.

While Book One: Air was generally well received, some aspects of the writing were criticized by reviewers. In Kotaku,  Kirk Hamilton wrote that he felt that the series failed to tackle its central conflicts in a meaningful way, commenting also on the mix of comedy and drama, the many character arcs in a shorter series than Avatar, and the neat ending. Raz Greenberg of Strange Horizons commented that Korra seemed as though she had things too easy in life in comparison to Aang, and also criticized the show's rapid pacing. Max Nicholson of IGN praised the series' writing, animation, humor, setting, and characters, and wrote that elements characterized as a deus ex machina had been foreshadowed throughout. But in his opinion, the love triangle arc between Mako, Asami, and Korra fell flat and the pro-bending arc felt superfluous, although it led up to the conflict with Amon. He also considered that Mako, although a major character, felt underwritten. Lauren Davis of io9, while approving of the character arcs and the setting, was also disappointed about the series' pacing.

Ratings
The initial airings of Book One: Air, excluding reruns and digital downloads, drew an average of 3.7 million viewers per episode.

Other media

Art book

An art book published by Dark Horse Comics, The Legend of Korra – Book One: Air – The Art of the Animated Series was released in July 2013. Edited by Dave Marshall and written by Michael Dante DiMartino and Bryan Konietzko, the art book collects concept art, sketches, storyboards, background paintings, model sheets and other development art from Book One, together with the creators' and artists' comments on the development process. Culture Mass praised the book as "meticulously executed and impressively comprehensive".

Home video
Book One: Air of The Legend of Korra was released on DVD and Blu-ray on 9 July 2013. It contains audio commentary from the creators, the cast and crew. Both versions are to contain, as a special feature, a comical interview with the series' characters in puppet form. The Blu-ray version comprises, additionally, audio commentaries for all episodes as well as the extra "Series creators' Favorite Scenes: Eight Animatics".

Novelization
Book One: Air was adapted as two novels by Erica David, aimed at readers aged twelve and up. The novelizations were published by Random House in 2013: 
Revolution, adapting episodes one to six, published on 8 January 2013
Endgame, adapting episodes seven to twelve, published on 23 July 2013

Soundtrack

The Legend of Korra is set to music by "The Track Team", the partnership of composers Jeremy Zuckerman and Benjamin Wynn. They jointly wrote the music for Avatar: The Last Airbender, but split their roles for The Legend of Korra: Zuckerman composed the music and Wynn was responsible for the sound design.  

Bryan Konietzko and Mike DiMartino's concept for the score was to blend traditional Chinese music with early jazz. On that basis, Zuckerman and Wynn composed a score combining elements of Dixieland, traditional Chinese music and Western orchestration, performed mainly by a string sextet and various Chinese solo instruments.

A soundtrack CD, The Legend of Korra: Original Music from Book One, was released on July 16, 2013. It features 26 instrumental tracks. Konietzko wrote that the album release required "an incredibly frustrating wait and battle" to overcome "a bureaucratic impasse". He wished for the record to be commercially successful to convince Nickelodeon to release an Avatar: The Last Airbender soundtrack, a subject of many fan petitions. The day after its release, the album was the bestselling soundtrack album and no. 5 in the pop sales rankings at the online retailer Amazon.com.

Track listing

References

External links

The Legend of Korra
2012 American television seasons
Murder–suicide in fiction
Murder–suicide in television